Shadegan (also Romanized as Shādegān and Shādgān; formerly, Fallehiyeh, Fallābīyeh, and Fallāḩīyeh (فلاحية)) is a city and capital of Shadegan County, Khuzestan Province, Iran.  At the 2006 census, its population was 48,642, in 8,600 families.

References

External links
 Shadegan Photo Gallery from the Khuzestan Governorship

Populated places in Shadegan County
Cities in Khuzestan Province
Arab settlements in Khuzestan Province